This is a list of viceroys in Saint Christopher (Saint Kitts), from the start of English colonisation in 1623 and French colonisation in 1625, until the island's independence from the United Kingdom as Saint Kitts and Nevis in 1983.

English Governors of Saint Christopher (1623–1666) 

Sir Thomas Warner, 1623–1649
Rowland Rich (or Redge), 1649–1651
Clement Everard, 1651–1660
William Watts, 1660–1666

In 1666, war broke between the French and English colonies, and the French gained control of the entire island.

French Governors of Saint-Christophe (1625–1713)

 Pierre Belain d'Esnambuc, 1625–1636
 Pierre du Halde, 1636–1638
 René de Béthoulat de La Grange-Fromenteau, 1638–1639
 Phillippe de Longvilliers de Poincy, 1639–1644, first time
 Robert de Longvilliers de Poincy, 1644–1646
 Phillippe de Longvilliers de Poincy, 1646–1660, second time
 Charles de Sales, 1660–1666
 Claude de Roux de Saint-Laurent, 1666–1689
 Charles de Pechpeyrou-Comminges de Guitaut, 1689–1690

Between 1690 and 1697, English had control of the entire island.

 Jean-Baptiste de Gennes, 1698–1702.

In 1702, English forces again seized control of the entire island.  The Treaty of Utrecht of 1713, finally ceded the entire island to Great Britain.

English Deputy Governors of Saint Christopher (1671–1769)
The 1667 Treaty of Breda restored the English portions of the island to its owners.  In 1671, Saint Christopher joined the British Leeward Islands, which was administered from Antigua by the Governor of the Leeward Islands.  Until 1769, a deputy governor was appointed to oversee local affairs.

Abednego Mathew, 1671–1681
Thomas Hill, 1682–1697
James Norton, 1697–1701
Walter Hamilton, 1704–1706

In 1706, French forces under Henri-Louis de Chavagnac occupied the island.

Michael Lambert, 1706–1715
William Mathews, Jr., 1715–1733
Gilbert Fleming, 1733–1769

Governors of Saint Christopher (1816–1833)

In 1816, the British Leeward Islands was dissolved, and Saint Christopher was again administered separately.

Stedman Rawlins, 1816
Thomas Probyn, 1816–1821
Charles William Maxwell, 1821–1832
Lieutenant-General Sir William Nicolay, 1832–1833

Lieutenant Governors of Saint Christopher (1833–1870) 
In 1833, the British Leeward Islands was reformed. A lieutenant governor was appointed to oversee Saint Christopher, subordinate to the Governor of Antigua, viceroy in the reformed colony.

John Lyons Nixon 1833–1836
Henry George Macleod, 1836–1839
Charles Cunningham, 1839–1847
Robert James Mackintosh, 1847–1850
Edward Hay Drummond Hay, 1850–1855
Hercules George Robert Robinson, 1855–1859
Benjamin Chilley Campbell Pine, 1860–1866
James George Mackenzie, 1867–1869
William Wellington Cairns, 1869–1870

Presidents of Saint Christopher (1870–1883) 
Francis Spencer Wigley, 1870–1872, first time
James Samuel Berridge, 1872–1873
Alexander Wilson Moir, 1873–1883

Presidents of Saint Christopher, Nevis and Anguilla (1883–1888) 
In 1883, Saint Christopher was united with Nevis and Anguilla under a single presidency based in Saint Christopher and named Saint Christopher, Nevis and Anguilla.

Charles Monroe Eldridge, 1883–1885
Francis Spencer Wigley, 1885–1888

Commissioner of Saint Christopher, Nevis and Anguilla (1889–1895) 
John Kemys Spencer-Churchill, 1889–1895

Administrators of Saint Christopher, Nevis and Anguilla (1895–1967) 

Thomas Riseley Griffith, 1895–1899
Charles Thomas Cox, 1899–1904
Sir Robert Bromley, 1904–1906
Thomas Laurence Roxburgh, 1906–1916
John Alder Burdon, 1916–1925
Thomas Reginald St. Johnston, 1925–1929
Terence Charles Macnaghten, 1929–1931
Douglas Roy Stewart, 1931–1940
James Dundas Harford, 1940–1947
Leslie Stuart Greening, 1947–1949
Frederick Mitchell Noad, 1949
Hugh Burrowes, 1949–1956
Henry Anthony Camillo Howard, 1956–1966
Frederick Albert Phillips, 1966–27 February 1967

Governors of Saint Christopher, Nevis and Anguilla (1967–1980) 

In 1967, Saint Christopher, Nevis and Anguilla became an associated state of the United Kingdom, responsible for its own internal affairs.

Sir Frederick Albert Phillips, 27 February 1967 – 1969, continued
Sir Milton Pensonville Allen, 1969–1975, acting to August 1972
Sir Probyn Ellsworth Inniss, 1975–13 April 1980

Governors of Saint Christopher and Nevis (1980–1983) 

In 1980, Anguilla achieved separation, and the state was renamed Saint Christopher and Nevis.

Sir Probyn Ellsworth Inniss, 13 April 1980 – 26 November 1981, continued
Clement Athelston Arrindell, November 1981–19 September 1983

On 19 September 1983, Saint Kitts and Nevis achieved independence from the United Kingdom.  For a list of viceroys after independence, see Governor-General of Saint Kitts and Nevis.

See also

 List of colonial heads of Nevis

References

 Rulers.org: Saint Kitts and Nevis
 Worldstatesmen.org: Saint Kitts and Nevis

L01
British Saint Christopher and Nevis people
Saint Christopher
governors
List
governors, Saint Christopher
governors, Saint Christopher